Måløv station is a station in Måløv on the Frederikssund radial of the S-train network in Copenhagen, Denmark.

Måløv station was built by Det sjællandske Jernbaneselskab (the Railway Company of Zealand, now Danish State Railways) and opened 17 June 1879 between Frederikssund and Frederiksberg. 
The railroad became electrified in 1989 and the traffic was transferred to the S-train network. In 2002, the railroad became double tracked in its whole length.

The station building is also from 1879 when 3 stations were built according to the same plan: Herlev station, Måløv station and Veksø station.

Services

See also
 List of railway stations in Denmark

References

S-train (Copenhagen) stations
Railway stations opened in 1879
Railway stations in Denmark opened in the 19th century